Christian Henry Bateman (1813–1889) was an English minister and hymn writer.

Bateman was born in 1813.
He is chiefly known as the writer of "Come, Christians Join to Sing" a remix of William Edward Hickson's "Join Now in Praise, and Sing".
After successfully serving as a congregational minister at the Moravian Church, he was ordained at the Church of England at age 30. 
He ministered at the Richmond Place Congregational Church in Edinburgh, Scotland, and successive Congregational parishes in Hopton, Yorkshire, and Reading, Berkshire. At age 56, he took Holy Orders in the Anglican Church and served as a curate and vicar in several Anglican parishes. He died in 1889.

References

English Congregationalist ministers
19th-century Church of England clergy
English hymnwriters
1813 births
1889 deaths